Douglas Harold Houda (born June 3, 1966) is a Canadian former National Hockey League (NHL) defenceman and current assistant coach of the New York Islanders. He was a former assistant coach for the Detroit Red Wings of the NHL. He was drafted in the second round, 28th overall, by the Red Wings in the 1984 NHL Entry Draft.

Playing career
After playing five seasons with the Western Hockey League's Calgary Wranglers and Medicine Hat Tigers, Houda made his NHL debut with the Red Wings near the end of the 1985–86 season.

Houda would be a journeyman throughout his career, playing for the Red Wings, Hartford Whalers, Los Angeles Kings, Buffalo Sabres, New York Islanders, and Mighty Ducks of Anaheim in his NHL travels. He also spent a great deal of time in the minor leagues playing for the Kalamazoo Wings and Utah Grizzlies in the IHL, and the Adirondack Red Wings and Rochester Americans with whom he would win the Calder Cup in 1996 in the AHL. After returning to Rochester in 1999 and serving as the Amerks captain in his final season, Houda retired after the 2002–03 season and immediately became an assistant coach under Randy Cunneyworth in Rochester.

Coaching career
On July 25, 2006, Houda was named an assistant coach for the Boston Bruins. He was relieved of his duties following the 2015–16 season, after 10 seasons with the Bruins. During Houda's 10 seasons with the club, the Bruins compiled a 428–264–94 record, seventh-best in the NHL over that span. Boston's 57 playoff wins over the same duration are fourth-most in the league, trailing only Chicago (76), Detroit (66) and Pittsburgh (66). Houda also spent three seasons as an assistant coach in the American Hockey League with the Rochester Americans from 2003–06. The Amerks compiled a 125–86–16–13 record in the span and held the league's best record in 2004–05 at 51–19–4–6 (112 points).

On May 10, 2016, Houda was named an assistant coach for the Detroit Red Wings He was relieved of his position following the conclusion of the 2021-2022 season. He spent six years with the Red Wings.

On July 5, 2022 The New York Islanders announced that Doug Houda and Brian Wiseman have been brought on as assistant coaches under Lane Lambert.

Career statistics

Regular season and playoffs

Awards
 WHL East Second All-Star Team – 1985

References

External links
 

1966 births
Living people
Adirondack Red Wings players
Boston Bruins coaches
Buffalo Sabres players
Calgary Canucks players
Calgary Wranglers (WHL) players
Canadian expatriate ice hockey players in the United States
Canadian ice hockey coaches
Canadian ice hockey defencemen
Canadian people of Ukrainian descent
Detroit Red Wings coaches
Detroit Red Wings draft picks
Detroit Red Wings players
Hartford Whalers players
Ice hockey people from Alberta
Kalamazoo Wings (1974–2000) players
Los Angeles Kings players
Medicine Hat Tigers players
Mighty Ducks of Anaheim players
New York Islanders players
New York Islanders coaches
People from Special Areas, Alberta
Rochester Americans coaches
Rochester Americans players
Utah Grizzlies (IHL) players